Brummet is a surname. Notable people with the surname include:

Anthony Brummet (born 1931), Canadian educator and politician
Don E. Brummet (1914–1981), American politician and businessman

See also
Brummett